Tadamon Sour Sporting Club, or simply Tadamon, is a football club based in Tyre, Lebanon, that competes in the . They play their home matches at the Tyre Municipal Stadium, and have won one Lebanese FA Cup and two Lebanese Challenge Cups.

History 
In 1939, a group of students from Tyre, Lebanon, established a football team, which officially received its license in 1947. Due to the 1948 Palestinian exodus, a number of Palestinian players joined Tadamon Sour. The team played numerous games in Syria and Jordan, and hosted Egyptian club Al Ahly in Tyre.

In 1991 Tadamon Sour finished runners-up in the Lebanese Second Division, and were promoted to the Lebanese Premier League. In 2000–01 they won the Lebanese FA Cup, beating Ansar 2–1 in the final.

Club rivalries 
Tadamon Sour plays Salam Sour in the Tyre derby. The club also plays the South derby with Ghazieh, based on their location.

Players

Current squad

Notable players

Honours
 Lebanese FA Cup
Winners (1): 2000–01
Lebanese Challenge Cup
Winners (2; joint record): 2013, 2018
Runners-up (1): 2017
Lebanese Second Division
 Winners (2): 1960–61 (South), 2015–16
Lebanese Federation Cup
 Runners-up (1): 1999

See also 
 List of football clubs in Lebanon

References

External links

 Official website 
 Tadamon Sour SC at LebanonFG

 
Football clubs in Lebanon
Association football clubs established in 1946
1946 establishments in Lebanon